John McVeigh may refer to:

 John McVeigh (Canadian football) (1925–2008), played for the Edmonton Eskimos
 John McVeigh (footballer) (born 1957), Scottish footballer
 John McVeigh (politician), Australian politician
 John J. McVeigh (1920–1944), American soldier and Medal of Honor recipient

See also
John McVay (disambiguation)
John McVey (born 1959), American singer-songwriter